Gretchen is a 2006 film directed by Steve Collins, starring Courtney Davis as the title character. The film was Collins' first full-length feature and was based on his short film Gretchen & the Night Danger.

Plot
Gretchen Finkle (Courtney Davis) is a 17-year-old high school student with a romantic obsession over Ricky (John Merriman). Her mother (Becky Ann Baker) becomes so concerned about Gretchen's crush that she sends her daughter to an in-patient emotional therapy clinic.

Cast
 Courtney Davis as Gretchen Finkle
 John Merriman as Ricky Marichino
 Macon Blair as Nick Rangoon 
 Becky Ann Baker as Lori Finkle
 Yasmine Kittles as Marla Auschussler
 Stephen Root as Herb
 Peyton Hayslip as Miss Jennings

Production

Development
Gretchen is a full-length adaptation of Steve Collins' 2004 short film Gretchen & the Night Danger, which won the Jury Award for Competition Shorts at South By Southwest.

Reception

Critical response
Sky Hirschkron, writing for Stylus Magazine, stated, "Collins is perceptive to Gretchen’s status as a loser; the problem is that he offers nothing to counterbalance it, resulting in a perspective inadvertently as cruel as her tormentors". Film Threats Don Lewis commented, "Gretchen is a really dry, funny and sad film [...] The bond between Gretchen and her mother is a sweet touch and without it, one might think Collins was cinematically abusing Gretchen just as everyone else does throughout the film."

Accolades

References

External links 
 
 
 

2006 films
American coming-of-age films
American children's comedy films
American romantic comedy films
American musical comedy films
American teen comedy films
American teen musical films
American fantasy comedy films
Features based on short films
American independent films
2006 directorial debut films
2000s English-language films
2000s American films